GlobalPost is an online US digital journalism company that focuses on international news founded on January 12, 2009, by Philip S. Balboni and Charles M. Sennott. Its stated mission is "to redefine international news for the digital age." GlobalPost now has 64 correspondents worldwide following the kidnapping and beheading of James Foley, an event which has raised questions about GlobalPost's role in sending unsupported personnel into conflict zones.

In 2015, GlobalPost was acquired by WGBH.

History 
In 2009 GlobalPost announced syndication agreements with PBS and CBS. As part of the PBS partnership, GlobalPost correspondents began producing video segments for airing on The PBS NewsHour. Additional arrangements with media outlets including the New York Daily News, The World Weekly, Times of India, and Newark Star-Ledger offered news organizations unlimited rights to republish GlobalPost content in exchange for a flat service fee. According to GlobalPost ownership, income from their syndication agreements accounted for more than 12-percent of the site's revenue.

Interest in the site's direct-to-reader paid access options, however, has been lackluster. Within a year of launch GlobalPost had discounted their premium "Passport Service"—which offered access to unique content, but had fewer than 400 subscribers—from $199 to $99 per year. A second price cut the same year discounted the subscription rate to less than $30.

Awards 

In 2011, GlobalPosts "On Location" video series was recognized with a Peabody Award and an Edward R. Murrow Award.

In 2014, the site was honored with a Robert F. Kennedy Journalism Award for its multimedia series "Myanmar Emerges"

References

External links
 

American news websites
Mass media in Boston
Peabody Award-winning websites
WGBH Educational Foundation